Meilleur Ouvrier de France (shortened to MOF) is a competition for craftsmen held in France every four years. The winning candidates receive a medal.

Description
The title of Meilleur Ouvrier de France is a unique and prestigious award in France, according to category of trades in a contest among professionals. This contest is organized and recognized as a third-level degree by the French Ministry of Labour. The President of the French Republic is granted honorary membership with the title MOF honoris causa. The awarding of medals occurs at the Sorbonne, in Paris, during a large reunion followed by a ceremony at the Élysée in the presence of the President of the French Republic.

This award for special abilities is unique in the world. Created in 1924, initially between the best workers of the era aged 23 and over, this contest was given the title of Meilleur Ouvrier de France (Best Craftsman of France). Today, by the diversity of specialities, the list of which is regularly updated, the award has also been awarded to more modern trades and high technology fields.

In this competition, the candidate is given a certain amount of time and basic materials not only to create a masterpiece, but to do so with a goal of approaching perfection. The chosen method, the organization, the act, the speed, the knowhow and the respect for the rules of the trade are verified by a jury just as much as is the final result. The winning candidates receive a medal and retain their title for life, with the indication of the specialty, the year following the one in which they obtain the title.

This prestigious title is equally recognized by professionals and the greater public in France, particularly among artisan-merchants such as pastrymakers, hairdressers, butchers, jewelers, and others whose trades are recognized, particularly those for more luxurious goods.

The Organizing Committee for Labor Exhibitions (COET) is an administrative body, placed under the authority of the French Ministry of National Education. It was created in 1935 and is responsible for the material organization of the “Meilleur Ouvrier de France” competition and the national labor exhibitions that conclude it. It became an association under the law of 1901 in 1961.

List of skills

Hospitality
 Pastrymaking and candymaking
 Cooked meat and catering
 Butchery
 Cooking and running restaurants
 Bakeries
 Ice creams and sorbets
 Chocolatiers
 Cheesemongers
 Fishmongers
 Waiters
 Receptionists
 Sommeliers

Buildings
 Wood carpentry
 Metallic ornaments and coverings
 Woodwork
 Painting and paint decoration
 Plumbing, installation of sanitary works, etc.
 Stonemasonry
 Cementworks
 Locksmithing and metalworking
 Climate engineering
 Stove fittings
 Artisanal ironwork
 Glasses and mirrors
 Decorative sculptures
 Engravings
 Reinforced Concrete
 Plasterworks
 Masonry
 Mosaics
 Glassworks
 Marbleworks
 Scale models (architecture)

Clothes  
 Millner
 Tailor
 Furs
 Lingerie
 Ready-to-wear Daywear
 Ready-to-wear Evening Dress

Fashion accessories and beauty 
 Lace
 Hand embroidery main
 Beauvais
 Openwork
 Colour Embroidery
 White Embroidery
 Gold Embroidery
 Haute-Couture Embroidery 

 Gloves
 Shoes
 Leather Craft
 Hairdressing
 Beauty care, Make Up

Textile industries
 Textile designers
 Printing on fabrics
 "Ready to wear" (high quality) products
 Restoration of tapestries and carpets
 Carpets
 Weaving

Home decoration
 Cabinetmaking
 Woodworking for seats
 Wood turners and benders
 Wood sculptures
 Luthiery
 Tapestries - weavers
 Tapestries - decorators
 Wood gilding
 Framing
 Marquetry
 Cooperage
 Wickerwork

Metallic structures
 Boilermaking
 Artisanal copperware
 Sheet metalworking

Industries
 General mechanics
 Electrical equipment and installation
 Foundry - tool construction
 Soldering
 Blacksmithing
 Composite materials

Precision techniques
 Cutlery
 Clockmaking
 Glassesmaking
 Dentalworks
 Armouryworks

Synthetic materials arts and techniques
 Plasticworks

Leathers and skins
 Taxidermy
 Trappings
 Shoes
 Traveling articles, leatherworking

Ceramics and glassworks
 Glass and crystals
 Stained glass windows
 Santons
 Glassblowing
 Ceramic restoration

Graphic arts and trades
 Advertising graphics
 Printing
 Photography
 Photography (laboratory)
 Silkscreen printing
 Creation of typographic characters
 Bookbinding

Artistic metalworks
 Jewellery (jewels)
 Creation of jewellery with precious metals
 Diamondworking
 Steel engraving
 Copper and steel graving (for printing)
 Heraldic and jewel engraving
 Luminous bronzework

Flowers and countryside
 Florist
 Gardening (artisanal)

Notable MOF winners
 Emile Drouhin (MOF 1958)
  Joël Robuchon (MOF 1976)
  André Soltner (MOF 1967)
  Claude Deligne (MOF 1973)
 Olivier Bajard (Métier de bouche)
 Paul Bocuse (Métier de bouche)
 Matthieu Miossec (Métier de bouche)
 Laurent Dassont (Métier de bouche)
 Pascal Caffet (Métier de bouche)
 René Fontaine (1946-...) : Master chocolatier, MOF 1976. (Métier de bouche)
 Yves Thuriès (Métier de bouche)
 Roger Vergé (Métier de bouche)
 Dominique Laporte (2004)(Métier de bouche-Sommelier)
 Jacques Torres
 Alain Fabregues (MOF 1991)
 Michel Roux (MOF 1976)
 Virginie Basselot
 Guy Lassausaie (Métier de bouche)
 Philippe Etchebest

Many members of the Compagnons du Devoir are also M.O.F.

See also
 Kings of Pastry, a 2009 documentary film about the M.O.F. pastrymaking competition

References

External links
      Annuaire des Meilleurs Ouvriers de France Directory 
      Comité d'Organisation Official page 
 Société des Meilleurs Ouvriers de France (association) 

Catering education in France
French awards